Mycetocola zhujimingii is a Gram-positive, aerobic and short-rod-shaped bacterium from the genus Mycetocola which has been isolated from the faeces of the antelope Pantholops hodgsonii from the Qinghai-Tibet Plateau in China.

References

Microbacteriaceae
Bacteria described in 2019